Spacerider, Space-Riders, or variation, may refer to:

 Space RIDER (Space Reusable Integrated Demonstrator for Europe Return), ESA uncrewed orbital spaceplane project
 Space Riders (1984 film) British sports drama film
 Space Riders: Division Earth, a web series starring Canadian comedian Mark Little
 Spacerider, a dance troupe founded by Tímea Papp
 Spacerider: Love at First Sight, album by electronica band Chandeen, 1998
 Spacerider, a single by Chandeen, 1998

See also
 Space (disambiguation)
 Rider (disambiguation)